Boğaziçi can mean:

 Boğaziçi (Istanbul), those parts of Istanbul with a view of the Bosphorus
 Boğaziçi, Alaca
 Boğaziçi, Baklan
 Boğaziçi, Burdur
 Boğaziçi, Düzce, a town in Düzce District of Düzce Province
 Boğaziçi, Kemah
 Boğaziçi, Milas, a fishing village on the shore of Lake Tuzla, and site of the ancient city of Bargylia
 Boğaziçi, Gaziantep, a town in Islahiye district of Gaziantep Province
 Boğaziçi University, Turkish public university in Istanbul.